A dart gun is an air rifle that fires a dart. The dart is tipped with a hypodermic needle and filled with a tranquilizer, vaccine, or antibiotic. A dart gun containing a tranquillizer is called a tranquillizer gun (also spelled tranquilizer, tranquilliser or tranquiliser).

History
The modern dart gun was invented in the 1950s by New Zealander Colin Murdoch. While working with colleagues to study populations of deer and wild goats introduced to New Zealand, he considered that killing the animals to examine them would be unnecessary if a dose of tranquillizer could be administered by projection from afar. To that end, Murdoch went on to develop a range of rifles, darts, and pistols.

The first modern remote drug-delivery system was invented by scientists at the University of Georgia in the 1950s, and was the direct predecessor to the Cap-Chur equipment used worldwide for decades.

In the early 1960s, a team in Kenya headed by Drs. Tony Pooley and Toni Harthoorn discovered that various species, despite being of roughly equal size (for example, the rhinoceros and the buffalo), needed very different doses and spectra of drugs to safely immobilize them.

Since 1967, hollow bullets with tranquillizers for immobilization of wild animals began to be used in the USSR. In the first half of the 1970s, experimental 9×53mmR cartridges for immobilization of wild animals for 9mm "Los" bolt-action carbine and "flying dart" for 16 gauge shotguns were made and tested. In the mid-1970s, "flying dart" for 12 gauge shotguns and experimental cartridges for immobilization of wild animals for the SPSh-44 pistol were made and tested. In the second half of the 1980s, the standard tranquillizer gun in the USSR was a single-shot IZh-18M shotgun (a dart with a dose of tranquillizer was fired with a blank cartridge).

Characteristics
The dart, usually .50 caliber (12.7 mm), is a ballistic syringe loaded with a solution and tipped with a hypodermic needle. The dart is propelled from the gun by compressed gas, and it is stabilized in flight by a tailpiece consisting of a tuft of fibrous material. The needle may be plain or collared, with a barb-like ring to improve retention of the needle and syringe to assure that the full dose is administered.

Methods of driving injection upon impact include: gas compression, spring compression, explosive charge, or gas evolution reaction. In one example, compressed air or butane in the rear of the dart pressurizes the solution, while the needle is capped to hold the fluid in place. Upon striking the target, the cap is pierced by the needle as it punctures the animal's skin. With the pressure released, the compressed gas pushes the solution out of the syringe and into the target (see diagrams from Veterinary Technician).

Agents 
Several immobilizing drugs have been devised for use in tranquillizer darts. These include:

 Azaperone
 Combelen (Bayer)
 Domosedan (Farmos)
 Dormicum (midazolam) (Roche)
 Detomidine (Farmos)
 Fentanyl and Carfentanyl (Janssen Pharmaceutica)
 Etorphine hydrochloride (M–99, Novartis)
 Haloperidol (Kyron Laboratory)
 Immobilon, a mixture of etorphine and a phenothiazine tranquillizer such as acepromazine or methotrimeprazine.
 Ketamine
 Valium (diazepam) (Roche)
 Xylazine (Rompun, Bayer)
 Sodium Thiopental (Abbott)

Antibiotics used in antibiotic darts vary by species.

Deer:
 Enrofloxacin
 Oxytetracycline
 Trimethoprim

Fox:
 Betamox
 Augmentin
 Clindamycin
 Enrofloxacin

Use on non-human animals
A dart gun may be used to sedate a target, such as in the cases of dog catchers and wildlife officers; to medicate a target, such as in the case of farmers and ranchers; or be used for both purposes, such as in the case of zookeepers and wildlife veterinarians.

Use on humans

Police use
Tranquilizer darts are not generally included in police less-than-lethal arsenals because a human can easily be wrestled to the ground, the pain induced by the dart may cause a suspect to pull out a weapon or panic and run until they are far away resulting in the officer having to track down the unconscious suspect, a human can have a deadly allergic reaction to a tranquilizer, and because effective use requires an estimate of the target's weight — too little tranquilizer will have no effect, and too much tranquilizer will result in death, which can lead to a lawsuit or being convicted of second-degree unintentional murder if the target is a human. "If you shot somebody that was small, it could kill them. If you shot somebody who was big or had drugs in their system, it might not do anything." says Newett, of the Justice Department. Harold C. Palmer said he only knew of one case of a tranquilizer dart being used against a criminal. This was in 1961 in a prison in Athens, Georgia. A 220-pound prisoner went berserk and the guard shot him with a tranquilizer dart. Six minutes later, the prisoner lost consciousness.

Criminal use
Tranquilizer darts are not used in kidnappings, rape, or identity theft because they would easily be detected in a public place such as a bar or restaurant. "Drugged beverages are so much easier to conceal," explains Dr. Theodore Davantzis. The only person who has been suspected to have used one criminally is Barry Morphew, who is suspected to have chased his wife around the house after shooting her with a tranquilizer dart and then murdering her before the drugs could take effect to prevent her from calling the police.

References

Further reading
 
 
 Anti-personnel dart design - patent details
 Blow gun inoculating dart design - patent details

Firearms
Non-lethal firearms
New Zealand inventions
New Zealand design